An ichnofacies is an assemblage of trace fossils that provides an indication of the conditions that their formative organisms inhabited.

Concept
Trace fossil assemblages are far from random; the range of fossils recorded in association is constrained by the environment in which the trace-making organisms dwelt.  Palaeontologist Adolf Seilacher pioneered the concept of ichnofacies, whereby the state of a sedimentary system at its time of deposition could be deduced by noting the trace fossils in association with one another.

Significance
Ichnofacies can provide information about water depth, salinity, turbidity and energy. In general, traces found in shallower water are vertical, those in deeper water are more horizontal and patterned.  This is partly because of the relative abundance of suspended food particles, such as plankton, in the shallower waters of the photic zone, and partly because vertical burrows are more secure in the turbulent conditions of shallow water.  In deeper waters, there is a necessary transition to sediment feeding (extracting nutrients from the mud).  Food availability, hence trace type, is also controlled by energy: high energy environments keep food particles suspended, whereas in lower energy areas, food settles out evenly, and burrows will tend to spread out to cover as much area as economically as possible.

Ichnofacies have a major advantage over using body fossils to gauge the same factors: body fossils can be transported, but trace fossils are always in situ.

Recognized Invertebrate Ichnofacies

Recognized Vertebrate Ichnofacies

See also
 Trace fossil classification
 Bioturbation

References

External links
 Types of Ichnofacies- University College London

Trace fossils